Apple chlorotic leafspot virus (ACLSV) is a plant pathogenic virus of the family Betaflexiviridae.

Damages
This virus reduces tree vigor (50% on pear), reduces yield (40% on pear), and causes quality reduction on fruits (if symptomatic).

Pathogen
This virus is a trichovirus with filamentous particles.  It has no natural vectors and it is easily transmitted mechanically to herbaceous hosts.

Transmission
The virus is only transmitted by grafting using infected clonal rootstocks, top-working existing trees with infected scion cultivars, and using infected trees as a source of propagation materials.

External links
ICTVdB – The Universal Virus Database: Apple chlorotic leafspot virus
Family Groups – The Baltimore Method

Trichoviruses
Viral plant pathogens and diseases